The 2008 Men's Hockey Setanta Sports Trophy was the second edition of the Setanta Sports Trophy, a men's field hockey tournament. It was held in Dublin, Ireland, from June 11 to 15, 2008, and featured four of the top nations in men's field hockey.

The tournament was held simultaneously with the women's competition.

Competition format
The tournament featured the national teams of Canada, Great Britain, Pakistan, and the hosts, Ireland, competing in a round-robin format, with each team playing each other once. Three points were awarded for a win, one for a draw, and none for a loss.

Officials
The following umpires were appointed by the International Hockey Federation to officiate the tournament:

 Ihsan-ul-Haque Babar (PAK)
 Marcin Grochal (POL)
 Jonathan Hyrtsak (CAN)
 Martin Madden (GBR)
 Christopher McConkey (IRE)

Results
All times are local (Irish Standard Time).

Preliminary round

Fixtures

Classification round

Third and fourth place

Final

Statistics

Final standings

Goalscorers

References

Setanta Sports Trophy
International field hockey competitions hosted by Ireland
Sport in Dublin (city)
Hockey Setanta Sports Trophy
Hockey Setanta Sports Trophy